The Payson Presbyterian Church at 160 South Main Street in Payson, Utah, United States was built in 1882.  It has also been known as Payson Bible Church.  It was listed on the National Register of Historic Places (NRHP) in 1986;  the listing included two contributing buildings.

Description
According to its NRHP nomination, it is "one of a number of Protestant churches constructed in Utah during the 1870s-90s, the period of most concentrated and active missionary work by Protestants among the Mormons."

It is also a contributing building in the Payson Historic District, which was listed on the National Register in 2007.

See also

 National Register of Historic Places listings in Utah County, Utah

References

External links

Churches on the National Register of Historic Places in Utah
Gothic Revival church buildings in Utah
Churches completed in 1882
Religious buildings and structures in Utah County, Utah
National Register of Historic Places in Utah County, Utah
Buildings and structures in Payson, Utah
Individually listed contributing properties to historic districts on the National Register in Utah